The Bell Road Bridge is a Pratt through truss bridge in Dexter Township, Washtenaw County, Michigan. Built in 1891, the bridge carried Bell Road over the Huron River. Since 1997, the bridge has sat on the riverbank, overgrown with brush. The bridge is a Michigan State Historic Site and is listed on the National Register of Historic Places.

History
The bridge was built by the Wrought Iron Bridge Company of Canton, Ohio, in 1891. A local crew assembled it with iron connecting pins, a method unique to the nineteenth century. The bridge was at the site of the town of Dover, a mill town of which little currently remains.

In late 1992, a drunk driver crashed into an end post on the bridge, resulting in its closure for part of 1993. Residents complained about having to detour a significant distance, so the bridge was reopened by the county road commission with a  weight limit, preventing its use by heavy vehicles. However, abutment stones continued to dislodge themselves, and the bridge was again closed to traffic. In 1995, the road commission requested funds from the state's Critical Bridge Fund for the replacement of the bridge with a two-lane concrete structure. However, residents wished to see the bridge repaired, and they successfully convinced the road commission to not seek a replacement. They also pushed for listing the bridge on the National Register of Historic Places; the bridge was listed on November 29, 1996. It is the third oldest known bridge built by the Wrought Iron Bridge Company still in existence. It also one of about ten metal through truss bridges in Michigan that date from the nineteenth century.

By 1997, the abutments were in such poor condition that it was feared that the bridge would be washed away in a spring flood, so it was removed from its abutments and placed on the southeastern riverbank. Since it was moved to the riverbank, the bridge has become overgrown with brush. On June 17, 1997, it was designated a Michigan State Historic Site and an informational marker was erected on February 2, 1999. Because of the bridge's deteriorated state, its National Register of Historic Places plaque is located not on the bridge, but in the garage of resident Bill Klinke.

On February 17, 2015, Dexter Township relinquished its right of first refusal to keep ownership of the bridge, allowing another municipality interested in relocating and rehabbing it for pedestrian use along the Border to Border trail to claim it.

Design
The bridge is a single-span, one-lane Pratt through truss. Its abutments are made of fieldstone. Prior to removal from its abutments, the bridge carried Bell Road over the Huron River.

See also

List of bridges on the National Register of Historic Places in Michigan
National Register of Historic Places listings in Washtenaw County, Michigan

References

Transportation in Washtenaw County, Michigan
Road bridges on the National Register of Historic Places in Michigan
Michigan State Historic Sites in Washtenaw County, Michigan
Bridges completed in 1891
1891 establishments in Michigan
Relocated buildings and structures in Michigan
National Register of Historic Places in Washtenaw County, Michigan
Wrought iron bridges in the United States
Pratt truss bridges in the United States
Buildings and structures in Washtenaw County, Michigan